Armindo Rodrigues de Sttau Monteiro (16 December 1896 – 15 October 1955), known as Armindo Monteiro, was a Portuguese university professor, businessman, diplomat and politician who exercised important functions during the Estado Novo period. 

Monteiro was born in Vila Velha de Ródão.  He served at the Ministry of the Colonies, the Ministry of Foreign Affairs and as the Portuguese ambassador to the United Kingdom during the first part of the Second World War.  He died in Loures, aged 58.

Sources

1896 births
1956 deaths
People from Vila Velha de Ródão
Finance ministers of Portugal